WKLL, WKRL-FM, and WKRH are a series of radio stations owned by Galaxy Communications. The FM stations, broadcasting at 94.9 MHz, 100.9 MHz, and 106.5 MHz respectively, are all branded as "K-Rock" and run an active rock format. The stations are licensed to Frankfort (Utica-Rome area), Syracuse, and Fair Haven, New York (serving the Oswego-Fulton area) respectively.

The Central New York K-Rock stations sponsor the annual K-Rockathon.

WKLL first went on the air on February 12, 1990 as a classic rock station with the "Classic 94.9" branding until 1992 switching to the current format modern rock with the "94 K-Rock" branding.  WKLL was Galaxy Communications' first station and its call sign comes from the initials of the daughter of Galaxy owner Ed Levine.

In 2016 Galaxy moved their Utica studios (WKLL, WOUR, WUMX, WTLB, WRNY and WIXT) from Washington Mills to downtown Utica inside the new Landmarc building (the former HSBC building) and renamed it Galaxy Media. At their new location the walls on the street side of each studio are made entirely of glass, allowing people to see DJs at work, similar to the Good Morning America studio.

On September 8, 2016, WKLL signed-on a new HD2 subchannel broadcasting a variety hits format as "Tony FM". The subchannel also broadcasts on low-power W256AJ at 99.1, which formerly served as a translator station for WRNY/WTLB/WIXT. An AM simulcast of the station was added on March 23, 2018 on WIXT in Little Falls.

References

External links
Official website

KLL
Radio stations established in 1990